Jon Randall Stewart (born February 17, 1969) is an American producer, songwriter, and musician.

His career began as a guitarist for Emmylou Harris' Nash Ramblers with whom he won his first Grammy for their Live at the Ryman album in 1992. Between 1995 and 2005 Randall released three solo albums, What You Don't Know, Willin' and Walking Among the Living. He recorded a fourth album, Cold Coffee Morning, which was not released.

As a songwriter, Randall has had many notable cuts including "Whiskey Lullaby" recorded by Brad Paisley and Alison Krauss which won the 2005 CMA Song of the Year Award, and “Tin Man” by Miranda Lambert which won the 2018 ACM Song of the Year Award. He has also had cuts with Reba McEntire, Emmylou Harris, Maren Morris, Dierks Bentley, Kenny Chesney, Kip Moore, Brad Paisley, Scotty McCreery, Guy Clark, Little Big Town, Gary Allan and Travis Denning.

Randall produced Dierks Bentley's Up on the Ridge (2010) which was nominated for the 2011 Grammy Award for Best Country Album, and The Mountain (2018). Both albums were nominated for ACM and CMA Album of the Year. Randall's production on The Mountain'''s "Burning Man ft. Brothers Osborne" also earned him the 2019 ACM Award for Music Event of the Year. Other artists he has produced records for include: Dwight Yoakam, Jack Ingram, Pat Green, Nitty Gritty Dirt Band, Jessi Alexander, and Parker McCollum.

Randall has been nominated for 4 Grammy Awards, 5 Academy of Country Music Awards and 6 Country Music Association Awards. See Awards section below.

On February 19, 2021, Randall released his first single in over 15 years, "Keep On Moving", co-produced, engineered and mixed by Brandon Bell. On April 2, 2021, Randall released a four-track solo project called Neon Texas.

 Music career 
 Emmylou Harris and The Nash Ramblers 
Randall's music career began as a guitarist for Emmylou Harris’ Nash Ramblers.

In 1992, Randall won a Grammy award under the winner name 'Emmylou Harris & The Nash Ramblers (Larry Altamanuik, Sam Bush, Roy Huskey, Jr., Al Perkins, Jon Randall Stewart)' for Best Country Performance by a Duo or Group with Vocal. The award was for the album Live at the Ryman.

In 2017, Harris, Randall, Bush and Perkins reunited at The Ryman Auditorium for a 25th anniversary concert of the "Live at the Ryman" album .

 Artist career 
Between 1995 and 2005 Randall released four solo albums, What You Don't Know, Cold Coffee Morning, Willin' and Walking Among the Living. The singles "Cold Coffee Morning" and "This Heart" both made appearances on the Billboard Hot Country Songs Charts.

On February 19, 2021, Stewart released his first single in over 15 years, "Keep On Moving", co-produced, engineered and mixed by Brandon Bell. On April 2, 2021, Stewart released a four-track solo project called Neon Texas.

 Miranda Lambert, Jack Ingram & Jon Randall 
On March 4, 2021, "In His Arms" was released collaboratively with Miranda Lambert and Jack Ingram. The single was accompanied by an announcement that the artists would be releasing a joint project called The Marfa Tapes on May 7, 2021, from which "In His Arms" was the first single. The project is a collection of raw live recordings from a trip to Marfa, Texas.

On March 12, 2021, The Marfa Tapes track "Tin Man" was released, followed by the release of "Am I Right or Amarillo" on March 26, 2021.The Marfa Tapes received a Grammy Award nomination for Best Country Album at the 64th Annual GRAMMY® Awards 

 18 South 
Randall is also a member of 18 South, a culmination of acclaimed songwriters and Nashville's best session musicians consisting of Jessi Alexander, Jimmy Wallace, Mike Bub, Larry Atamanuik and Guthrie Trapp. In 2010 they released their debut album Soulful Southern Roots Music.

 Brad Paisley with Alison Krauss 
Randall co-wrote the song "Whiskey Lullaby" with Bill Anderson, which was released by Brad Paisley as a duet with Alison Krauss in 2004. The song received multiple award nominations, won the 2005 CMA Song Of The Year Award, and peak at No. 3 on the Billboard Hot Country Singles & Tracks (now Hot Country Songs) charts, and No. 41 on the Billboard Hot 100. As of July 2015, "Whiskey Lullaby" was certified 2× Platinum by the Recording Industry Association of America.

 Dierks Bentley 
Randall produced Dierks Bentley's Up on the Ridge (2010) and The Mountain (2018).Up on the Ridge was nominated for a Grammy Award for Best Country Album, and nominated for the ACM and CMA Album Of The Year. The album debuted at No. 9 on the U.S. Billboard 200, No. 2 on the Billboard Top Country Albums chart, and at No. 1 on the U.S. Billboard Bluegrass Albums charts. The second single from the album, "Draw Me a Map" was co-written by Bentley and Randall, and peaked at No. 33 on the Billboard Hot Country Songs.

Co-produced with Ross Copperman, The Mountain was nominated for both the ACM and CMA Album of the Year. Their production on The Mountain's "Burning Man ft. Brothers Osborne" also earned them the 2019 ACM Award for Music Event of the Year. The Mountain debuted at No. 1 on Billboard's Top Country Albums and No. 3 on the Billboard 200 charts.

 Miranda Lambert 
In 2017 Miranda Lambert released "Tin Man" which Stewart co-wrote with Lambert and Jack Ingram. The song won the 2018 ACM Song of the Year Award, and was also nominated for the 2017 CMA Song of the Year and 2018 Grammy Award for Best Country Song. As of February 2019, "Tin Man" received platinum certification by the Recording Industry Association of America.

In 2021 Miranda Lambert released her single, "If I Was A Cowboy" which was co-produced by Randall and Luke Dick.

 Jack Ingram 
Randall produced Jack Ingram's last two albums, Midnight Motel (2016) and Ridin' High... Again (2019).Ridin' High... Again also includes Ingram's rendition of "Tin Man", written by Randall, Ingram, and Miranda Lambert, which was previously released by Lambert and earned the three writers the 2018 ACM Song of the Year Award. Ingram and Randall also co-wrote "Where There's a Willie" and "Everybody Wants to Be Somebody" (along with Todd Snider).

 Parker McCollum 
In 2020, Randall produced Parker McCollum’s EP Hollywood Gold'', with the lead single "Pretty Heart" achieving platinum certification. He also co-wrote "Love You Like That" with Parker McCollum and Billy Montana. In 2021, Parker McCollum released his current record "Gold Chain Cowboy" which was produced by Jon Randall.

Chase Bryant 
On February 26, 2021, Chase Bryant released "Upbringing" the lead single from his upcoming album of the same name. The song was written by Bryant, Randall and Stephen Wilson, produced by Randall and recorded at Arlyn Studios in Austin, TX.

Personal life
Randall married country music star Lorrie Morgan in 1996; the couple divorced in 1999. Randall is now married to country singer/songwriter Jessi Alexander.

Awards

Artist discography

Studio albums

Singles

Music videos

Songwriting and production discography
American record producer and songwriter, Jon Randall, has released four studio albums as a solo artist. He has produced for artists including Dierks Bentley, Dwight Yoakam, Pat Green, Nitty Gritty Dirt Band, Jessi Alexander, and Parker McCollum. His extensive list of cuts also includes Miranda Lambert, Reba McEntire, Emmylou Harris, Maren Morris, Dierks Bentley, Kenny Chesney, Kip Moore, Brad Paisley, Scotty McCreery, Guy Clark, Little Big Town, Gary Allan and Travis Denning.

Producer

Songwriter

References

1969 births
American country singer-songwriters
American male singer-songwriters
Epic Records artists
Grammy Award winners
Living people
Musicians from Dallas
RCA Records artists
Record producers from Texas
Singer-songwriters from Texas
Country musicians from Texas